Minuscule 510 (in the Gregory-Aland numbering), 496 (in the Scrivener's numbering), ε 259 (in the Soden numbering), is a Greek minuscule manuscript of the New Testament, on parchment. It has been assigned to the 12th century. The manuscript has complex contents. Marginalia are incomplete. It was adapted for liturgical use.

Description 

The codex contains the complete text of the four Gospels on 305 parchment leaves (size ). The text is written in one column per page, 22 lines per page.

There is no a division according to the Ammonian Sections, with references to the Eusebian Canons.

The Pericope Adulterae (John 7:53-8:11) is marked with an obelus.

Text 

The Greek text of the codex is a representative of the Byzantine text-type. Hermann von Soden included it to the textual family Kr. It was confirmed by the Claremont Profile Method. Aland placed it in Category V.

According to the Claremont Profile Method it represents Kr in Luke 1 and Luke 20 as a perfect member. In Luke 10 no profile was made.

History 

The manuscript is dated by the INTF on the palaeographical ground to the 12th century.

In 1727 the manuscript came from Constantinople to England and was presented to archbishop of Canterbury, William Wake, together with minuscules 73, 74, 506-520. Wake presented it to the Christ Church College in Oxford.

The manuscript was added to the list of New Testament minuscule manuscripts by F. H. A. Scrivener (496) and C. R. Gregory (510). Gregory saw it in 1883.

It is currently housed at the Christ Church (Wake 25) in Oxford.

See also 

 List of New Testament minuscules
 Biblical manuscript
 Textual criticism

References

Further reading

External links 

Greek New Testament minuscules
12th-century biblical manuscripts